The Battle (also known as Thunder in the East) is a 1934 Franco–British co-production English language drama film directed by Nicolas Farkas, and starring Charles Boyer, Merle Oberon and John Loder. It was adapted from a 1909 French novel by Claude Farrère entitled La bataille.

Plot
In 1904 during the Russo-Japanese War, a Japanese naval officer gets his wife, played by Merle Oberon, to seduce a British attaché in order to gain secrets from him. Things begin to go wrong when she instead falls in love with him.

Cast
 Charles Boyer as Marquis Yorisaka
 Merle Oberon as Marquise Yorisaka
 John Loder as Fergan
 Betty Stockfeld as Betty Hockley
 Valéry Inkijinoff as Hirata
 Miles Mander as Feize
 Henri Fabert as The Admiral

Production
This was first released as a French-language film entitled La bataille with many of the same cast members, but with Oberon's part played by the French actress Annabella.

In the United States, the English film was released in August 1935 under the title Thunder in the East.

The English version was revived in 1943 under a new title, Hara-Kiri, and changes were made that transformed the film into an anti-Japanese wartime propaganda film.  The primary changes were a foreword relating to Pearl Harbour and Japanese perfidy, as well as an epilogue about the cowardice of hara-kiri.

See also
 The Battle (1923)

References

Bibliography
 Cook, Pam. Gainsborough Pictures. Cassell, 1997.

External links

 Unifrance "The Battle"

1934 films
1930s historical films
1930s war drama films
British historical films
British war drama films
1930s English-language films
Films about suicide
Films set in 1904
Films set in Japan
French war drama films
French historical films
British multilingual films
French multilingual films
Films directed by Victor Tourjansky
French black-and-white films
Remakes of French films
Sound film remakes of silent films
British black-and-white films
1934 multilingual films
Films directed by Nicolas Farkas
1934 drama films
1930s British films
1930s French films